Virti Vaghani is an Indian actress and model, specially known for Jai Shri Krishna (जय श्री कृष्ण 2008) and Hope Aur Hum (2018), also worked in advertising for more than 100 commercials and developing her acting career.

Early life 
Virti was born in Mumbai Maharastra in her parents' house and live with them.

Acting career
Virti initially started as a child artist by advertising for well-known brands such as Whirlpool, Kwality Walls, Clinic Plus Shampoo, Dettol Soap, Knorr Soup, Mobilla and Colgate. She started her career in the year 2008 with the television show Jai Shri Krishna where playing a role for child Radha premiered on Colors TV which have been shared with Nick Channel. Recently, which is being dubbed and telecast in Tamil and Bengali TV channels. Afterwards, she worked in Patiala House in 2008, stars Akshay Kumar and Anushka Sharma, directed by Nikkhil Advani which was her first debut in bollywood. And in 2018, she worked  a Comedy-drama film Hope Aur Hum, starring Naseeruddin Shah and Sonali Kulkarni.  In a case, playing the role of Tanu from Hope Aur Hum, she was facing difficulty in pronouncing a few words correctly, then Naseeruddin Shah became helpful and tried ‘Henry Higgins’ trick on her which was fascinating as she claimed. In 2020, she appeared in the Disney+Hotstar web series ‘Aarya’, featuring Sushmita Sen, Chandrachur Singh and Sikandar Kher. Where she plays the role of Aarya's teenage daughter Arundhati, who is typically in her teen stage of life and usually threatened to fall into an immoral relationship.

Filmography

References

External links
 

2003 births
Living people
Actresses from Mumbai
21st-century Indian actresses